"DC×3" (Dead Cat Three Times) is the second single released by Australian rock band Grinspoon, from the debut album, Guide to Better Living.  It peaked at No. 50 on the ARIA Singles Chart. It also reached No. 34 on Triple J's Hottest 100 in 1997.

"DC×3" was written by band members Phil Jamieson and Pat Davern. The song was recorded at Rocking Horse Studios in February 1997.  The B-side, "Fire Engine Man" was recorded live and mixed at Soundlevel Studios in January 1997.

Track listing

Personnel
Grinspoon members
 Phil Jamieson – vocals, guitar
 Pat Davern – guitar
 Joe Hansen – bass guitar 
 Kristian Hopes – drums

Production details
 Engineer - Jason Blackwell ("Fire Engine Man") 
 Recording Engineer - Greg Courtney 
 Mastering - Don Bartley
 Mixing - Phillip McKellar 
 Producer - Phil McKellar, Grinspoon - Producer
 Studio - Rocking Horse Studios

Charts

References

1997 singles
Grinspoon songs
Song recordings produced by Phil McKellar
1997 songs
Universal Records singles
Songs written by Phil Jamieson
Songs written by Pat Davern